Karabahşılı is a village in the Gölbaşı District, Adıyaman Province, Turkey. Its population is 97 (2021).

The hamlets of Arpatarlası, Çayırkom, Eskidam, İncirli, Karaçukur, Kiro, Kocameme, Köklüce and Oynatan are attached to the village.

References

Villages in Gölbaşı District, Adıyaman Province